This is a list of German television related events from 2013.

Events
14 February - Cascada are selected to represent Germany at the 2013 Eurovision Song Contest with their song "Glorious". They are selected to be the fifty-eighth German Eurovision entry during Unser Song für Malmö held at the TUI Arena in Hanover.
10 May - 12-year-old Michèle Bircher wins the first season of The Voice Kids.
11 May - Beatrice Egli wins the tenth season of Deutschland sucht den Superstar.
31 May - Verliebt in Berlin actor Manuel Cortez and his partner Melissa Ortiz-Gomez win the sixth season of Let's Dance.
27 September - Actress Jenny Elvers wins the first season of Promi Big Brother.
14 December - 17-year-old animal trainer Lukas Pratschker and his dog Falco win the seventh season of Das Supertalent.
20 December - Andreas Kümmert wins the third season of The Voice of Germany.

Debuts

Domestic
6 January -  (2013) (ZDF)
13 September - Promi Big Brother (2013–present)

International
8 April - // Martha Speaks (2008–2014) (Super RTL)

Television shows

1950s
Tagesschau (1952–present)

1960s
 heute (1963-present)

1970s
 heute-journal (1978-present)
 Tagesthemen (1978-present)

1980s
Wetten, dass..? (1981-2014)
Lindenstraße (1985–present)

1990s
Gute Zeiten, schlechte Zeiten (1992–present)
Unter uns (1994-present)
Verbotene Liebe (1995-2015)
Schloss Einstein (1998–present)
In aller Freundschaft (1998–present)
Wer wird Millionär? (1999-present)

2000s
Deutschland sucht den Superstar (2002–present)
Let's Dance (2006–present)
Das Supertalent (2007–present)

2010s
The Voice of Germany (2011–present)

Ending this year

Births

Deaths

See also 
2013 in Germany